The Sleeping Cupid is a, now-lost, sculpture created by Renaissance artist Michelangelo, which he artificially aged to make it look like an antique on the advice of Lorenzo di Pierfrancesco in order to sell for a higher price. It was this sculpture which first brought him to the attention of patrons in Rome.

Creation 
Michelangelo began working on his sleeping cupid in 1495, in Florence, Italy. It was never said by Michelangelo as to why he carved a sculpture of a cupid, but it is known that he studied a sculpture in the Medici Gardens that contained a sleeping cupid. Michelangelo's work was described by Ascanio Condivi, Italian Painter, as, "a god of love, aged six or seven years old and asleep".

Description 
Michelangelo created the sculpture and then passed it onto a dealer, Baldassare del Milanese. Eventually the sleeping cupid was bought by Cardinal Riario of San Giorgio, controversy arose when he discovered the statue was falsely aged and demanded his money back. However, Michelangelo was permitted to keep his share of the money. When Michelangelo offered to take the sculpture back from Baldassare when he learned how much money he made off of selling it, Baldassare refused, saying, "he would rather break it into a hundred pieces; he had bought the child, and it was his property". 

The Sleeping Cupid was a significant work in establishing the reputation of the young Michelangelo, who was 21 at the time. The sculpture was later donated by Cesare Borgia to Isabella d'Este, and was probably collected by Charles I of England when all the Gonzaga collections were bought and taken to London in the seventeenth century. 

It was previously impossible to attempt to identify Michelangelo's cupid, until Paul Norton's proposal that Michelangelo's work may be in the Album of Busts and Statues in Whitehall. This led to one of the cupids on the album to be thought to be Michelangelo's lost cupid, as the description matches quite well. But it is still unknown if this is the exact one Michelangelo created, as there is no record the statue after the original sale.

Destruction 
In 1698, the Sleeping Cupid was most likely destroyed in the great fire in the Palace of Whitehall, London along with many other fine works of art. It is unknown what happened to the sculpture.

See also
List of works by Michelangelo

References

Sculptures by Michelangelo
Lost sculptures
Sculpture forgeries
1496 sculptures
Sculptures of Cupid
Gonzaga art collection

European sculpture
Michelangelo